Triigi may refer to several places in Estonia:

Triigi, Harju County, village in Kõue Parish, Harju County
Triigi, Lääne-Viru County, village in Väike-Maarja Parish, Lääne-Viru County
Triigi, Saare County, village in Leisi Parish, Saare County